This is a list of hospitals in Rhode Island (U.S. state), sorted by hospital name.

Bradley Hospital - East Providence, Providence County, founded 1931
Butler Hospital - Providence, Providence County, Rhode Island's first hospital, opened 1847
Eleanor Slater Hospital at the John O. Pastore Center - Cranston, Providence County
Eleanor Slater Hospital/Zambarano Unit - Burrillville, Providence County
Hasbro Children's Hospital - Providence, Providence County, 1994
Kent Hospital - Warwick, Kent County, 1951
Landmark Medical Center - Woonsocket, Providence County, 1988
Miriam Hospital - Providence, Providence County, 1925
Newport Hospital - Newport, Newport County, 1873
Our Lady of Fatima Hospital - North Providence, Providence County, 1954
Providence VA Medical Center - Providence, Providence County, 1948
Rhode Island Hospital - Providence, Providence County, 1868
Rehabilitation Hospital of Rhode Island - North Smithfield, Providence County
Roger Williams Medical Center - Providence, Providence County, 1878
South County Hospital- South Kingstown, Washington County, 1919
 Saint Joseph's Hospital, Providence, Providence County, 1892
Westerly Hospital - Westerly, Washington County, 1925
Women & Infants Hospital of Rhode Island - Providence, Providence County, opened 1885 as the "Providence Lying-In Hospital"

Former hospitals 

 John E. Fogarty Memorial Hospital at The Ladd School - Exeter, opened 1962, later demolished
Memorial Hospital of Rhode Island - Pawtucket, opened 1910, closed 2017
 Naval Hospital — Newport, built 1909, closed ca. 1990
 Osteopathic Hospital of Rhode Island opened in 1933 in Cranston. Renamed Osteopathic General Hospital in 1947. Renamed once again in 1971 as Cranston General Hospital. Closed September, 1993 as a result of bankruptcy.
 Providence City Hospital, opened 1910; in 1931 re-named Charles V. Chapin hospital, fell into decline and purchased by Providence College in 1974
 Rhode Island Homeopathic Hospital — Providence, opened 1884, closed 1900

External links

References

Rhode Island

Hospitals